Blizzard of Souls or The Rifleman (U.K. title) is a 2019 Latvian historical drama directed by . It premiered on 8 November 2019 in Latvia and on 20 February 2020 internationally at the European Film Market. The film is an adaptation of Aleksandrs Grīns'  written about his service as a Latvian Rifleman in World War I. It was selected as the Latvian entry for the Best International Feature Film at the 93rd Academy Awards, but it was not nominated.

Synopsis 
After witnessing his mother being shot by the invading Imperial German Army, sixteen-year-old Artūrs, together with his father, decides to enlist in the national Latvian Riflemen battalions of the Imperial Russian Army in hopes of getting revenge and finding glory. Artūrs goes on to fight in World War I on the Eastern Front, where he loses his father and brother and quickly becomes disillusioned. He joins Bolsheviks, but when ordered to execute his friend he realizes Bolshevik disregard for them and desserts, returning to his newly-proclaimed country to fight in the Latvian War of Independence and start everything from scratch.

Cast

Production 
Oto Brantevics, the actor for the lead role of Artūrs, was selected out of 1,300 candidates, despite Brantevics having no prior acting experience. Former Minister of Defence Raimonds Bergmanis made a cameo appearance in the film, while the then Minister of Defence Artis Pabriks appeared as an extra. Several of the battle scenes were shot at the locations where the historical battles had taken place. Valdis Celmiņš drew inspiration for his cinematography from Christian Berger's concept of avoiding wide establishing shots by using a wide lens for medium shots and closeups, as well as László Nemes' film Son of Saul.

Reception

Box office 
During the first five weeks of screening the film was seen by more than 200,000 people, making it the most-watched film since the restoration of Latvian independence.

Critical response 
Metacritic assigned the film a weighted average score of 63 out of 100 based on 9 critics, indicating "generally favorable reviews". Ellen E Jones of The Guardian praised Brantevics' acting, yet concluded that "as a national coming-of-age story, The Rifleman never quite outgrows its innocent, uncritical patriotism". Deborah Young of The Hollywood Reporter also noted the film as being "underscored by evident, old-fashioned patriotism", but praised the "exceptionally atmospheric" cinematography by Celmiņš, "poignantly respectful" score by Ritmanis and editing by Belogrudovs, summarizing Blizzard of Souls as "[a] more realistic 1917".

The acting and cinematography was similarly praised by Rob Aldam of Backseat Mafia who believed the film "has the look and feel of a Hollywood blockbuster" and called it "one of the best war films of the last few years". Guy Lambert from The Upcoming described the cinematography as "utterly breathtaking" and "reminiscent of the brilliance of Band of Brothers" and called the acting "raw and exceptionally emotional", concluding "this film will no doubt be a hit."

Awards and nominations

See also 
 Latvian Riflemen
 List of submissions to the 93rd Academy Awards for Best International Feature Film
 List of Latvian submissions for the Academy Award for Best International Feature Film

References

External links
 Official website 
 
 Official international trailer 
 Official U.K. trailer 

2019 films
Latvian drama films
Latvian-language films
World War I films based on actual events
2019 drama films